The Karlesspitze or Grubspitze  is a mountain in the Schnalskamm group of  the Ötztal Alps on the border between Tyrol, Austria, and South Tyrol, Italy.

References 
 Walter Klier: Alpenvereinsführer Ötztaler Alpen, Bergverlag Rudolf Rother, München 2006.  
 Richard Goedeke: 3000er in den Nordalpen, Bruckmann, München 2004, 
 Alpine Club Map, Scale 1:25.000, Sheet 30/1, Gurgl, 
 Casa Editrice Tabacco, Udine: Carta Topografica 1:25.000, Sheet 04, Schnalstal/Val Senales, Naturns/Naturno

Mountains of the Alps
Mountains of Tyrol (state)
Mountains of South Tyrol
Alpine three-thousanders
Ötztal Alps
Austria–Italy border
International mountains of Europe